Dirphiopsis is a genus of moths in the family Saturniidae first described by Eugène Louis Bouvier in 1928.

Species
Dirphiopsis ayuruoca (Foetterle, 1902)
Dirphiopsis cochabambensis (Lemaire, 1977)
Dirphiopsis curvilineata Decaens, Wolfe & Herbin, 2003
Dirphiopsis delta (Foetterle, 1902)
Dirphiopsis epiolina (R. Felder & Rogenhofer, 1874)
Dirphiopsis flora (Schaus, 1911)
Dirphiopsis herbini Wolfe, 2003
Dirphiopsis janzeni Lemaire, 2002
Dirphiopsis multicolor (Walker, 1855)
Dirphiopsis oridocea (Schaus, 1924)
Dirphiopsis picturata (Schaus, 1913)
Dirphiopsis pulchricornis (Walker, 1855)
Dirphiopsis schreiteri (Schaus, 1925)
Dirphiopsis trisignata (R. Felder & Rogenhofer, 1874)
Dirphiopsis undulinea (F. Johnson, 1937)
Dirphiopsis unicolor Lemaire, 1982
Dirphiopsis wanderbilti Pearson, 1958
Dirphiopsis wolfei Lemaire, 1992

References

Hemileucinae
Taxa named by Eugène Louis Bouvier